John Henry Ottemiller (1916–1968) was an American librarian.  He wrote the authoritative Ottemiller's index to plays in collections : an author and title index to plays appearing in collections published between 1900 and 1985.  He was chief librarian of the Ralph J. Bunche Library.

Bibliography
 The Selective Book Retirement Program at Yale
 Federal services to libraries with Philipps Temple: Federal Relations Committee of the American Library Association, Chicago. (1954)
 Ottemiller's index to plays in collections : an author and title index to plays appearing in collections published between 1900 and 1985

References

American librarians
1916 births
1968 deaths